Housley is a surname. Notable people with the surname include:

Adam Housley (husband of actress Tamera Mowry) (born 1972), joined Fox News Channel (FNC) in 2001 as a Los Angeles-based correspondent
Frankie Housley (1926–1951), the lone stewardess on National Airlines Flight 83, which crashed  in January, 1951
Norman Housley, Professor of History and head of the School of Historical Studies at the University of Leicester
Phil Housley (born 1964), former ice hockey player